Joseph Lynn Wright (July 22, 1952 – June 17, 2022) was an American politician.

Wright was born in Columbus, Mississippi. He served in the Mississippi House of Representatives from 2020 until his death in 2022 from amyotrophic lateral sclerosis and was a Republican. He died in Tuscaloosa, Alabama.

References

1952 births
2022 deaths
People from Columbus, Mississippi
Republican Party members of the Mississippi House of Representatives
Deaths from motor neuron disease